Bonn Agreement could refer to

Bonn Agreement (Afghanistan)
Bonn Agreement (1969)
Bonn Agreement (religion)

See also
Bonn Convention